Christian Reformed Church may refer to:
Christian Reformed Churches (Netherlands), a Protestant church in the Netherlands
Christian Reformed Church in North America, a Protestant Christian denomination in the United States and Canada
Christian Reformed Churches of Australia, a Christian denomination established in Australia

See also 
 CRC (disambiguation)